Archcathedral Basilica of St. Stanislaus Kostka is an archcathedral basilica located in Łódź, Łódź Voivodeship; in Poland.

History

The building committee was called in 1895. The cornerstone was blessed on June 16, 1901, by Bishop of Warsaw Wincenty Teofil Popiel. The building was built out of non-plastered brick, in the Rohbau architectural style, by which the church was built between 1901 and 1912, following the plans of the Wende i Zarske firm. The construction of the church was co-led by Berliner Emil Zillmann, with small corrections made by architects: Józef Pius Dziekoński, and Sławomir Odrzywolski-Nałęcz from Kraków. The naved basilica is based on the Ulm Minster in Ulm, Germany. The archcathedral in Łódź, is the tallest building in the city, with a height of 104.5 metres, and is one of the highest churches in Poland.

References

Churches in Łódź
Basilica churches in Poland
Roman Catholic churches completed in 1912
1901 establishments in Poland
Roman Catholic cathedrals in Poland
20th-century Roman Catholic church buildings in Poland